Second Presbyterian Church may refer to:

Northern Ireland 

 Second Ballyeaston Presbyterian Church, a congregation of the Presbyterian Church in Ireland

United States 

 Second Presbyterian Church (Guilford, Baltimore, Maryland), church of Franklin L. Sheppard
 Second Presbyterian Church (Birmingham, Alabama), listed on the NRHP in Alabama
 Second Presbyterian Church (Chicago, Illinois), listed on the NRHP in Illinois
 Second Presbyterian Church (Indianapolis, Indiana)
 Second Presbyterian Church (Lexington, Kentucky), listed on the NRHP in Kentucky
 Second Presbyterian Church (St. Louis, Missouri), listed on the NRHP in Missouri
 Second Presbyterian Church (Princeton, New Jersey), merged with Nassau Presbyterian Church
 Second Presbyterian Church (Columbus, Ohio), listed on the NRHP in Ohio
 Second Presbyterian Church (Portsmouth, Ohio), listed on the NRHP in Ohio
 Second Presbyterian Church (Chattanooga, Tennessee), listed on the NRHP in Tennessee
 Second Presbyterian Church (Memphis, Tennessee) (1891), listed on the NRHP in Tennessee
 Second Presbyterian Church (Memphis, Tennessee) (1952)
 Second Presbyterian Church (Petersburg, Virginia), listed on the NRHP in Virginia
 Second Presbyterian Church (Richmond, Virginia), listed on the NRHP in Virginia